Events from the year 1894 in Bolivia.

Incumbents
President: Mariano Baptista

Events

Births

Deaths
February 27 - Hilarión Daza

1890s in Bolivia